The 1997 CFL season is considered to be the 44th season in modern-day Canadian football, although it is officially the 40th Canadian Football League season.

CFL News in 1997
The CFL entered the 1997 season with eight teams, instead of nine. The Ottawa Rough Riders ceased operations and folded after the 1996 season. In February, a dispersal draft was held for the players who were under contract with the Ottawa franchise.

The Montreal Alouettes began the 1997 season under new ownership, which was headed by Robert C. Wetenhall. Wetenhall and his ownership group retained the Alouette name and logo.

With the Rough Riders departure, the CFL returned the Winnipeg Blue Bombers to the East Division.

The CFL also changed the playoff format, adding a 'cross-over' rule. Previously, the 3rd place team in each division played the 2nd place team in the division semifinals. Under the new rule, should the 4th place team in one division have a better record than that of the 3rd place team in the other division, the 4th place team crosses over to the other division's semifinal, taking that 3rd place team's place. There is no tie-breaker; the cross-over hopeful must have a strictly better record to advance. BC attained a cross-over playoff berth in the first year under this rule. The rule remains in effect.

Regular season standings

Final regular season standings
Note: GP = Games Played, W = Wins, L = Losses, T = Ties, PF = Points For, PA = Points Against, Pts = Points

Bold text means that they clinched playoff spots.
Edmonton and Toronto both had first round byes.
Due to the cross-over rule – the BC Lions played the Montreal Alouettes in the East Semi-Final Game.

Grey Cup playoffs

The Toronto Argonauts won their second-straight Grey Cup championship in 1997, defeating the Saskatchewan Roughriders 47–23, at Edmonton's Commonwealth Stadium.  The Argonauts' Doug Flutie (QB) was named the Grey Cup's Most Valuable Player and Paul Masotti (WR) was the Grey Cup's Most Valuable Canadian.

Playoff bracket

CFL Leaders
 CFL Passing Leaders
 CFL Rushing Leaders
 CFL Receiving Leaders

1997 CFL All-Stars

Offence
QB – Doug Flutie, Toronto Argonauts
FB – Robert Drummond, Toronto Argonauts
RB – Mike Pringle, Montreal Alouettes
SB – Derrell Mitchell, Toronto Argonauts
SB – Darren Flutie, Edmonton Eskimos
WR – Alfred Jackson, BC Lions
WR – Milt Stegall, Winnipeg Blue Bombers
C – Mike Kiselak, Toronto Argonauts
OG – Fred Childress, Calgary Stampeders
OG – Pierre Vercheval, Montreal Alouettes
OT – Uzooma Okeke, Montreal Alouettes
OT – Neal Fort, Montreal Alouettes

Defence
DT – Rob Waldrop, Toronto Argonauts
DT – Doug Petersen, Montreal Alouettes
DE – Elfrid Payton, Montreal Alouettes
DE – Bobby Jurasin, Saskatchewan Roughriders
LB – Maurice Kelly, BC Lions
LB – Willie Pless, Edmonton Eskimos
LB – Shonte Peoples, Winnipeg Blue Bombers
CB – Kavis Reed, Edmonton Eskimos
CB – Marvin Coleman, Calgary Stampeders
DB – Glenn Rogers Jr., Edmonton Eskimos
DB – Johnnie Harris, Toronto Argonauts
DS – Lester Smith, Toronto Argonauts

Special teams
P/K – Mike Vanderjagt, Toronto Argonauts
ST – Mike "Pinball" Clemons, Toronto Argonauts

1997 Eastern All-Stars

Offence
QB – Doug Flutie, Toronto Argonauts
FB – Robert Drummond, Toronto Argonauts
RB – Mike Pringle, Montreal Alouettes
SB – Derrell Mitchell, Toronto Argonauts
SB – Jock Climie, Montreal Alouettes
WR – Paul Masotti, Toronto Argonauts
WR – Milt Stegall, Winnipeg Blue Bombers
C – Mike Kiselak, Toronto Argonauts
OG – Bruce Beaton, Montreal Alouettes
OG – Pierre Vercheval, Montreal Alouettes
OT – Uzooma Okeke, Montreal Alouettes
OT – Neal Fort, Montreal Alouettes

Defence
DT – Rob Waldrop, Toronto Argonauts
DT – Doug Petersen, Montreal Alouettes
DE – Elfrid Payton, Montreal Alouettes
DE – Willie Whitehead, Hamilton Tiger-Cats
LB – Ken Benson, Toronto Argonauts
LB – Mike O'Shea, Toronto Argonauts
LB – Shonte Peoples, Winnipeg Blue Bombers
CB – Adrion Smith, Toronto Argonauts
CB – Orlando Steinauer, Hamilton Tiger-Cats
DB – Harold Nash, Montreal Alouettes
DB – Johnnie Harris, Toronto Argonauts
DS – Lester Smith, Toronto Argonauts

Special teams
P/K – Mike Vanderjagt, Toronto Argonauts
ST – Mike "Pinball" Clemons, Toronto Argonauts

1997 Western All-Stars

Offence
QB – Jeff Garcia, Calgary Stampeders
FB – Kelvin Anderson, Calgary Stampeders
RB – Sean Millington, BC Lions
SB – Vince Danielsen, Calgary Stampeders
SB – Darren Flutie, Edmonton Eskimos
WR – Alfred Jackson, BC Lions
WR – Terry Vaughn, Calgary Stampeders
C – Mike Withycombe, BC Lions
OG – Fred Childress, Calgary Stampeders
OG – Leo Groenewegen, Edmonton Eskimos
OT – Thomas Rayam, Edmonton Eskimos
OT – John Terry, Saskatchewan Roughriders

Defence
DT – Joe Fleming, BC Lions
DT – Bennie Goods, Edmonton Eskimos
DE – Malvin Hunter, Edmonton Eskimos
DE – Bobby Jurasin, Saskatchewan Roughriders
LB – Maurice Kelly, BC Lions
LB – Willie Pless, Edmonton Eskimos
LB – Alondra Johnson, Calgary Stampeders
CB – Kavis Reed, Edmonton Eskimos
CB – Marvin Coleman, Calgary Stampeders
DB – Glenn Rogers Jr., Edmonton Eskimos
DB – Dale Joseph, Saskatchewan Roughriders
DS – Trent Brown, Edmonton Eskimos

Special teams
P/K – Mark McLoughlin, Calgary Stampeders
ST – Gizmo Williams, Edmonton Eskimos

1997 Intergold CFLPA All-Stars

Offence
QB – Doug Flutie, Toronto Argonauts
OT – John Terry, Saskatchewan Roughriders
OT – Rocco Romano, Calgary Stampeders
OG – Fred Childress, Calgary Stampeders
OG – Bruce Beaton, Montreal Alouettes
C – Mike Kiselak, Toronto Argonauts
RB – Robert Drummond, Toronto Argonauts
FB – Sean Millington, BC Lions
SB – Milt Stegall, Winnipeg Blue Bombers
SB – Darren Flutie, Edmonton Eskimos
WR – Alfred Jackson, BC Lions
WR – Terry Vaughn, Calgary Stampeders

Defence
DE – Elfrid Payton, Montreal Alouettes
DE – Leroy Blugh, Edmonton Eskimos
DT – John Kropke, Saskatchewan Roughriders
DT – Rob Waldrop, Toronto Argonauts
OLB – Darryl Hall, Calgary Stampeders
OLB – Shonte Peoples, Winnipeg Blue Bombers
ILB – Calvin Tiggle, Hamilton Tiger-Cats
CB – Donald Smith, Toronto Argonauts
CB – Marvin Coleman, Calgary Stampeders
HB – Glenn Rogers Jr., Edmonton Eskimos
HB – Johnnie Harris, Toronto Argonauts
S – Trent Brown, Edmonton Eskimos

Special teams
K – Mark McLoughlin, Calgary Stampeders
P – Tony Martino, Calgary Stampeders
ST – Mike "Pinball" Clemons, Toronto Argonauts

Head coach
 Adam Rita, BC Lions

1997 CFL Awards
CFL's Most Outstanding Player Award – Doug Flutie (QB), Toronto Argonauts
CFL's Most Outstanding Canadian Award – Sean Millington (FB), BC Lions
CFL's Most Outstanding Defensive Player Award – Willie Pless (LB), Edmonton Eskimos
CFL's Most Outstanding Offensive Lineman Award – Mike Kiselak (C), Toronto Argonauts
CFL's Most Outstanding Rookie Award – Derrell Mitchell (SB), Toronto Argonauts
CFLPA's Outstanding Community Service Award – Mark McLoughlin (K), Calgary Stampeders
CFL's Coach of the Year – Don Matthews, Toronto Argonauts
Commissioner's Award - Bolan and Egres

References

Canadian Football League seasons
CFL